Bernard Kincaid (born June 5, 1945) is an American politician who is the former Mayor of Birmingham, Alabama, elected in 1999. In 2007 he was defeated in a bid for re-election, winning only 8% of votes. He was succeeded by Larry Langford.

Early life and education 
Kincaid was born in the Birmingham neighborhood of Pratt City, Alabama, the son of a coal-miner. He began his political career early, being elected president of his fifth-grade class at South Pratt Elementary School. He was also president of the Miles College Student Government Association during his senior year of college. He graduated from Western Olin High School in 1962 and received his undergraduate degree from Miles College in 1970. He went on to earn an M.A. from Miami University in Ohio (1971), a Ph.D. from the University of Alabama (1980), and a Juris Doctor from the Birmingham School of Law (1994). He served in the United States Air Force between 1962–66 and was given an honorable discharge.

Career 
Kincaid has served as a youth counselor for the Social Security Administration (1970–71), as an educational consultant, assistant professor and as assistant to the Dean of the School of Health Related Professions at the University of Alabama at Birmingham from 1971 to 1995 and contract director of development at Miles College from 1996 to 1997. He was also vice-president and later president of the Ensley Highlands Neighborhood Association and vice-president of the Five Points West community in Birmingham. In 1997, he was elected to represent District 8 in the Birmingham City Council and two years later defeated interim-Mayor William A. Bell in a runoff to become mayor. Kincaid was also member of the Alabama delegation to the 2000 Democratic National Convention.

He is a member of the Metropolitan C.M.E. Church, Ensley and sings in the W. A. Baskerville Gospel Chorus. He is a member of American Legion, Post 1165 and of the Alabama Education Association.
 
He has sat on the boards of various groups, including the Birmingham Sister City Commission, the Miles College Alumni Association and Booster Club, Omega Psi Phi fraternity, Sigma Pi Phi fraternity, the Jefferson County Progressive Democratic Council, Sigma Kappa Delta law association, Glenwood Mental Health Services foundation, the Birmingham Urban League, the Pratt-Ensley Kiwanis Club, and the Birmingham Partnership.

By virtue of his position, he also held positions on the boards of the Birmingham Jefferson Convention Complex, the Birmingham Racing Commission, the Metropolitan Planning Organization, the Jefferson County Mayors Association, Alabama Conference of Black Mayors, and U.S. Conference of Black Mayors.

Personal life 
Kincaid lives in Ensley. He has been married to the former Alfreda Harris since New Year's Eve 1972 and has one daughter, Amy.

References

 Mayor's biography at informationbirmingham.com - Accessed March 30, 2006

1945 births
Living people
Mayors of Birmingham, Alabama
University of Alabama at Birmingham faculty
Miles College alumni
Miami University alumni
Alabama city council members
African-American mayors in Alabama
People from Ensley, Alabama
21st-century African-American people
20th-century African-American people